The Kyiv Open is a professional tennis tournament played on clay courts. It is currently part of the ATP Challenger Tour. The tournament was held annually in Kyiv, Ukraine from 1995 to 2005. After 15 years of break, the tournament returned in 2021.

History 
The Kyiv Open in the status of ATP Challenger competitions was held from 1998 to 2005. During this time, such world tennis stars as Nicolás Almagro, Fernando Verdasco, Marc Rosset, Irakli Labadze, Nenad Zimonjić, Jan Kroshlyak took part in it. The first steps in the professional arena were taken by Sergey Stakhovsky, Orest Tereshchuk, Sergey Yaroshenko, Mikhail Filima, Aleksandr Nedovyesov.

After 15 years of break ATP Challenger competition in Kyiv returned in 2021.

Past finals

Singles

Doubles

References

 
ATP Challenger Tour
Clay court tennis tournaments
Tennis tournaments in Ukraine
Sports competitions in Kyiv